Scott Overall (born 9 February 1983 in Hammersmith, London) is a British athlete who runs for the Blackheath & Bromley running club.
Scott was officially named part of the 2012 GB Olympic team on 5 December 2011 after achieving "A-Standard" at the Berlin marathon.  He finished 61st in the London Olympic Marathon of 2012 in a time of 2:22:37

Overall attended Archdeacon Cambridge's Church of England Primary School until 1994 then Orleans Park Secondary School in Twickenham until 1999. Overall then attended Butler University in Indiana, United States, from 2004-2007. He was also an usher at Mo Farah's wedding.

International competitions

References 

1983 births
Living people
People from Hammersmith
Athletes from London
British male long-distance runners
British male middle-distance runners
British male marathon runners
English male long-distance runners
English male middle-distance runners
English male marathon runners
Olympic male marathon runners
Olympic athletes of Great Britain
Athletes (track and field) at the 2012 Summer Olympics
British Athletics Championships winners
Butler University alumni
People educated at Orleans Park School